The Renfe Class 252 are a series of Bo'Bo' electric locomotives, built by CAF, Meinfesa, Siemens and Krauss-Maffei for RENFE. 15 units were built for the AVE Madrid–Seville high speed line in (standard gauge version), and 60 units constructed for general use to Iberian gauge (1668mm).

Background, design, construction and history
The series of locomotives were ordered to modernise RENFE's fleet and to provide traction on the new standard gauge Madrid to Seville line, on Iberian gauge lines they were to replace RENFE Classes 276, 277 and 278 which were of some age, and incapable of speeds of 200 km/h; the order coincided with the construction of the first standard gauge high speed line in Spain, and was won in 1989 by a consortium of Swiss and German companies led by Siemens including Krauss-Maffei, Thyssen-Henschel and ABB.

The locomotives design was a development of that used in DB Class 120, which eventually led to the Siemen's EuroSprinter family of locomotives; of which the Class 252 can be considered a predecessor. The first 15 locomotives were built to  gauge in Germany, a further 60 locomotives were manufactured to  gauge by CAF and Meinfesa in Spain.

31 locomotives were dual voltage machines operating on 3 kV DC and 25 kV AC, the remaining 44 operated on 3 kV DC only. Subsequent to their introduction some of the locomotives have been re-bogied to both standard and Iberian gauge to meet operational requirements.

Locomotives built for the standard gauge high speed lines carried a white/grey 'AVE' livery, whilst the Iberian gauge machines were delivered in 'Taxi'/'Amarillo' (Yellow/Grey) livery, later some carried 'Arco' and 'Altaria' branding. In 2005 all locomotives became part of Renfe. These locomotives can be seen today throughout the Spanish territory of electrified railway lines.

In 1995, 252 054 was seriously damaged in an accident in El Paso Despeñaperros, being scrapped later in Villaverde Bajo. In 2003 252 062 was involved in an accident in Zuera and scrapped.

In 2010 four locomotives were modified for freight work on standard gauge lines from Barcelona to Le Soler (nr. Perpignan) in France. The vehicles were fitted with ERTMS compatible train safety devices, standard gauge bogies; they will also operated from 1.5 kV DC on some sections of the route.

See also
CP Class 5600 similar locomotives built at the same time for the Portuguese railways, operating only on 25 kV AC

References

Further reading
RENFE 252. La tracción eléctrica, Author: Josep Miquel, Reserva Anticipada Ediciones S.L.,

External links
Complete Technical Data
Locomotives Reference List, "High-Performance Universal Locomotive S 252", p. 22, www.transportation.siemens.com
Renfe Operadora - 252 List of individual units with service information, via www.listadotren.es

Images

RENFE 252 at Trainspo High quality pictures of RENFE 252 via "trainspo.com"
252 Images of locomotives of class 252, via www.railwaymania.com
Spanish electric class 252 Images of class 252, via www.railfaneurope.net

252
Electric locomotives of Spain
Railway locomotives introduced in 1991
Standard gauge locomotives of Spain
5 ft 6 in gauge locomotives
Passenger locomotives